German submarine U-737 was a Type VIIC U-boat of Nazi Germany's Kriegsmarine built for service during World War II. Her keel was laid down on 14 February 1942 by Schichau-Werke of Danzig. She was commissioned on 30 January 1943 with Oberleutnant zur See Wolfgang Poeschel in command.

Design
German Type VIIC submarines were preceded by the shorter Type VIIB submarines. U-737 had a displacement of  when at the surface and  while submerged. She had two shafts and two  propellers.

U-737 was fitted with five  torpedo tubes (four fitted at the bow and one at the stern), fourteen torpedoes, one  SK C/35 naval gun, 220 rounds, and two twin  C/30 anti-aircraft guns. The boat had a complement of between forty-four and sixty.

Service history
The boat was attacked twice by aircraft while on active service. Once early in 1944, by a RAF British Liberator aircraft. She managed to damage the plane with anti-aircraft fire, which had to abort the attack and was forced to make a belly landing because of damage sustained. In later 1944, the U-boat was attacked by a Soviet plane, three crew were injured, before she dived.

Wolfpacks
U-737 took part in eight wolfpacks, namely:
 Monsun (4 – 22 October 1943)
 Isegrim (16 – 27 January 1944) 
 Werwolf (27 January – 9 February 1944) 
 Taifun (5 – 7 March 1944) 
 Trutz (2 – 6 June 1944) 
 Feuer (17 – 19 September 1944) 
 Grimm (24 September – 2 October 1944) 
 Panther (16 – 23 October 1944)

Fate
While on active duty under the command of Oberleutnant zur See Friedrich-August Greus, U-737 sank at 00:18 on 19 December 1944 in the Vestfjorden, in position . She had collided with German depot ship, MRS 25. 31 crew died, with 20 survivors.

References

Bibliography

External links

German Type VIIC submarines
World War II submarines of Germany
World War II shipwrecks in the Norwegian Sea
U-boats sunk in 1944
U-boats sunk by German warships
1943 ships
Ships built in Danzig
Ships built by Schichau
U-boats sunk in collisions
Maritime incidents in December 1944